Gabon Championnat National D1 is the top division of the Gabonese Football Federation, it was created in 1968.

Gabon Championnat National D1 Clubs - 2015/16
Bitam (Bitam)
Cercle Mbéri Sportif (Libreville)
FC 105 Libreville (Libreville)
Mangasport (Moanda)
Missile (Libreville)
Mounana (Libreville)
Nguen'Asuku (Franceville)
Olympique de Mandji (Port-Gentil)
Oyem (Oyem)
Pélican (Lambaréné)
Port-Gentil (Port-Gentil)
Sapins (Libreville)
Stade Mandji (Port-Gentil)
Stade Migoveen (Lambaréné)

Previous winners

1968: Olympique Sportif (Libreville)
1969: Aigle Royal (Libreville)
1970–71: Aigle Royal (Libreville)
1971–72: Solidarité (Libreville)
1972–73: Olympique Sportif (Libreville)
1973–74: Police (Libreville)
1974–75: Zalang (Libreville)
1975–76: Petrosport (Port Gentil)
1976–77: Vantour Mangoungou (Libreville)
1977–78: Vantour Mangoungou (Libreville)
1978–79: ASMO/FC 105 (Libreville)
1979: Anges (Libreville)
1980: USM Libreville
1981: USM Libreville
1982: ASMO/FC 105
1983: ASMO/FC 105
1983–84: Sogara (Port Gentil)
1985: ASMO/FC 105
1986: ASMO/FC 105
1986–87: ASMO/FC 105
1987–88: USM Libreville
1988–89: Sogara (Port Gentil)
1989–90: JAC (Libreville)
1990–91: Sogara (Port Gentil)
1991–92: Sogara (Port Gentil)
1993: Sogara (Port Gentil)
1994: Sogara (Port Gentil)
1995: Mangasport
1996: Mbilinga (Port Gentil)
1997: Abandoned 
1998: FC 105 Libreville
1999: FC 105 Libreville
2000: Mangasport
2001: FC 105 Libreville
2002: USM Libreville
2003: Bitam
2004: Mangasport
2005: Mangasport
2006: Mangasport
2006–07: FC 105 Libreville
2007–08: Mangasport
2008–09: Stade Mandji
2009–10: Bitam
2010–11: Missile
2011–12: Mounana
2012–13: Bitam
2013–14: Mangasport
2014–15: Mangasport
2015–16: CF Mounana
2016–17: CF Mounana
2017–18: Mangasport
2018–19: Cercle Mbéri Sportif
2019–20: Abandoned 
2022: Stade Mandji

Performance By Club

Topscorers

References

Sources 
List of Champions

External links
Official site
League at fifa.com

RSSSF competition history

 
Football competitions in Gabon
Gabon
1968 establishments in Gabon
Sports leagues established in 1968